This is a non-exhaustive list of buildings in Melbourne, Victoria, Australia and surrounding suburbs listed on the Victorian Heritage Register. This the highest level of protection afforded to a building in the state of Victoria. A far greater number of buildings and precincts are covered by Heritage Overlays in local government planning schemes, though these may not have the same level of protection.

Public buildings

 City Baths
 Eastern Hill Fire Station
 General Post Office
 Government House
 HM Prison Pentridge, Coburg
 National Gallery of Victoria
 Old Melbourne Gaol
 Old Melbourne Magistrates' Court
 Old Treasury Building
 Parliament House
 Queen Victoria Women's Centre (formerly Queen Victoria Memorial Hospital)
 Russell Street Police Headquarters (former)
 Royal Exhibition Building
 Shrine of Remembrance
 State Library of Victoria
 Supreme Court of Victoria
 Titles Office (former)

Town Halls

 Box Hill Town Hall
 Collingwood Town Hall
 Fitzroy Town Hall
 Footscray Town Hall
 Melbourne Town Hall
 Prahran Town Hall
 South Melbourne Town Hall

Railway stations

 Auburn station
 Caulfield station
 Essendon station
 Flinders Street station
 Footscray station
 Glenferrie station
 Hawthorn station
 Malvern station
 Mentone station
 North Melbourne station
 Ripponlea station
 Williamstown station
 Windsor station

Institutional buildings

 Baldwin Spencer Building, Melbourne University
 Emily McPherson College of Domestic Economy
 The Mac.Robertson Girls' High School
 Melbourne Grammar School
 Melbourne High School
 Melbourne Trades Hall, Carlton
 Old Pathology Building, Melbourne University
 Old Physics Conference Room and Gallery, Melbourne University
 Ormond College
 Kew Lunatic Asylum

Commercial buildings

 67 Spencer Street, former Victorian Railway Headquarters, now Grand Hotel Melbourne
 140 William Street (formerly BHP House)
 A. C. Goode House, Queen Street
 Alkira House, Queen Street
 Austral Building, Collins Street
 Former Bank of Australasia - Treasury on Collins Apartment Hotel, Collins Street / Queen Street
 Block Arcade
 Bryant and May Factory, Richmond
 Coop's Shot Tower
 Dovers Building, Drewery Lane
 Duke of Wellington Hotel
 ES&A (Gothic) Bank
 Gordon House
 Windsor Hotel, Spring Street
 Lombard Building, Queen Street
 Orica House, Nicholson Street
 Manchester Unity Building, Collins Street / Swanston Street
 Metropolitan Meat Market, North Melbourne
 National Mutual Life Association Building
 Nicholas Building, Swanston Street / Flinders Lane
 Olderfleet Building
 Queen Victoria Market
 Rialto Towers
 Royal Arcade
 Safe Deposit Building
 Young & Jackson, Flinders Street / Swanston Street
 Yule House, Little Collins Street

Theatres and cinemas

 Arts Centre Melbourne (1984)
 Astor Cinema, St Kilda
 Athenaeum Theatre
 Capitol Theatre
 Forum Theatre
 Her Majesty's Theatre
 Palais Theatre, St Kilda
 Princess Theatre
 Regent Theatre
 Rivoli Cinemas, Camberwell (Rivoli Theatre)

Religious buildings

 Collins Street Baptist Church
 East Melbourne Synagogue
 Lutheran Trinity Church, East Melbourne
 Scot's Church
 St Francis' Church
 St Patricks Cathedral
 St Pauls Cathedral
 The Mission to Seafarers
 Wesley Church
 Albanian Mosque, Carlton North

Residential

 Bishopscourt, East Melbourne (1853)
 Cairo Flats, Fitzroy (1936)
 Como House, South Yarra
 D'Estaville, Kew (1859)
 Frognall, Canterbury
 Horatio Jones house, Tecoma
 Labassa, Caulfield North
 Lalor House, Richmond
 Newburn Flats, (1941)
 Raheen, Kew
 Rippon Lea Estate, Elsternwick (1868)
 Rupertswood, Sunbury (1876)
 Stonnington Mansion, Malvern (1890)
Valentine's Mansion; now Caulfield Grammar School - Malvern Campus
 Werribee Park Mansion, Werribee (1877)
 McCrae Homestead, McCrae (1844)
 Sunnyside Farm, Templestowe Circa (1890)

Sporting grounds and grandstands
 Melbourne Cricket Ground, Jolimont
Michael Tuck Stand (Glenferrie Oval), Hawthorn
Main Grandstand (Brunswick Street Oval), North Fitzroy
 Olympic Swimming Stadium

Other structures
 Clifton Hill Shot Tower 
 Coop's Shot Tower 
 Luna Park
 Newport Workshops
 No 2 Goods Shed
 Nylex Clock
 Polly Woodside
 Richmond Power Station
 Royal Parade
 Sidney Myer Music Bowl
 Station Pier
 St Kilda Pavilion
 Time Ball Tower
 Victoria Dock
 Wailing Wall (Melbourne)

Bridges
 Morell Bridge
 Princes Bridge
 Queens Bridge
 Sandridge Bridge

See also
 Architecture of Melbourne
 Melbourne's Lost Victorian Landmarks

References

 
Heritage